Charles Addison Chickering (November 26, 1843 – February 13, 1900) was a U.S. Representative from New York.

Life
Born in Harrisburg, New York, Chickering attended the common schools and Lowville Academy and was for some time a teacher in that institution.  He engaged in business as a hardware merchant.  He served as school commissioner of Lewis County 1865–1875.  He was a member of the New York State Assembly (Lewis Co.) in 1879, 1880 and 1881; and was Clerk of the Assembly from 1884 to 1890. He served as chairman of the Lewis County Republican committee. He served as member of the Republican State committee, serving as secretary, and as a member of its executive committee.

Chickering was elected as a Republican to the Fifty-third and to the three succeeding Congresses and served from March 4, 1893, until his accidental death from injuries received in a fall from a window of the Grand Union Hotel in New York City while on a business trip February 13, 1900.  He served as chairman of the Committee on Railways and Canals (Fifty-fourth through Fifty-sixth Congresses).  He was interred in Riverside Cemetery, Copenhagen, New York.

See also
List of United States Congress members who died in office (1900–1949)

References

1843 births
Accidental deaths from falls
Accidental deaths in New York (state)
Hardware merchants
1900 deaths
Republican Party members of the New York State Assembly
People from Lewis County, New York
Republican Party members of the United States House of Representatives from New York (state)
Clerks of the New York State Assembly
19th-century American politicians